The men's 200 metre butterfly event at the 1956 Olympic Games took place on 30 November and 1 December. This swimming event used the butterfly stroke. Because an Olympic-size swimming pool is 50 metres long, this race consisted of four lengths of the pool. This was the first time that the butterfly stroke had appeared in the Olympic Games.

Medalists

Results

Heats

Three heats were held.  The swimmers with the eight fastest times advanced to the Finals.  The swimmers that advanced are highlighted.

Heat One

Heat Two

Heat Three

Final

References

Men's buterfly 200 metre
Men's events at the 1956 Summer Olympics